Dahil sa Pag-ibig (International title: Confessions of the Heart / ) is a Philippine television drama series that aired on ABS-CBN from March 12, 2012 to June 29, 2012, replacing Budoy and was replaced by Lorenzo's Time.

Overview
The TV series sets on the backdrop on a political family in a small town whose lives intercross when it comes to tying the bonds when it comes to love and family and the secrets beneath there political views and personal lives.

Production
The concept was visualized around September 2011. In a press conference held by ABS-CBN, they announced that an upcoming television drama, with a working title of Padre de Pamilya will be part of ABS-CBN's programs on the first quarter of 2012. They announced that the two leads will be Piolo Pascual and Jericho Rosales, and that Pascual's character is a priest. Other supporting actors that was revealed were Christopher de Leon, Maricar Reyes, Rafael Rosell, and Denise Laurel. This is Rafael last ABS CBN show before moving to GMA Network in that year. In November 2011, some scenes were filmed in Rome, Italy for Pascual's priest scenes in Vatican City. On January 25, 2012, ABS-CBN then launched the television series as Nang Dahil Sa Pag-Ibig with another actress added, Cristine Reyes.  It is helmed by the directors of the critically acclaimed television drama, Minsan Lang Kita Iibigin, Darnel Villaflor and Avel Sunpongco.

Promotion
A special teaser for the trailer was released on February 22, 2012 stating that the series is now titled Dahil Sa Pag-Ibig. The full trailer was released on February 27, 2012 during the ABS-CBN television drama, Budoy. The series' premiere will be March 12, 2012.

Cast and characters

Main cast
 Piolo Pascual as Fr. Alfred Valderama / Benjamin Osorio Jr. 
 Jericho Rosales as Oliver Falcon / Jepoy Osorio
 Maricar Reyes as Agnes Javier
 Cristine Reyes as Jasmin Valderama 
 Christopher de Leon as Gov. Leo Valderama

Main cast
 Rafael Rosell as Edson Zaguirre
 Denise Laurel as Wendy Garcia
 Rey "PJ" Abellana as Marlon Rivero 
 Tetchie Agbayani as Belinda Rivero 
 Freddie Webb as Daniel Falcon 
 Carla Martinez as Helen Falcon
 Joonee Gamboa as Fr. Benedict Cruz 
 Cheska Iñigo as Marina Zaguirre 
 Malou Crisologo as Yaya Ceding 
 Kristel Fulgar as Andrea Rivero 
 Lorenzo Mara as Dennis Velasco 
 Edward Mendez as Theo

Guest cast 
 Lui Villaruz as Mike Barrios
 Johnny Revilla as Mr. Javier
 Maritess Joaquin as Mrs. Javier
 Mark Sarayot as Janus
 Nanding Josef as Nonoy
 Idda Yaneza as Lita Magpantay

Special participation 
 Ronaldo Valdez as Don Ramon Velasco
 Sandy Andolong as Cindy Velasco-Valderama
 Joel Torre as Benjamin Osorio
 Melissa Mendez as Elena Osorio
 Bing Davao as Rodolfo Zaguirre
 Francis Magundayao as Teen Alfred Valderama
 Ella Cruz as Teen Jasmin Valderama
 Carlo Lacana as Teen Edson Zaguirre
 Annica Tindoy as kid Jasmin Valderama
 Nathaniel Britt as kid Alfred Valderama
 Yong An Chiu as Young Mike Barrios
 Quintin Alianza as Kid Edson

Soundtrack

Track listing

Awards and nominations

See also 
List of programs broadcast by ABS-CBN
List of ABS-CBN drama series

References

External links 
 
 
 

ABS-CBN drama series
Television series by Dreamscape Entertainment Television
2012 Philippine television series debuts
2012 Philippine television series endings
Philippine political television series
Philippine romance television series
Filipino-language television shows
Television shows filmed in the Philippines
Television shows filmed in Italy